Hickory Grove is an unincorporated community and Edge city in Ellington Township, Adams County, Illinois, United States. It is situated on the outskirts of the city of Quincy and is part of the Quincy, IL–MO Micropolitan Statistical Area.

Hickory Grove is considered to be Quincy's second largest suburb after North Quincy.

Location
Hickory Grove extends little under a mile along Broadway from 60th Street to 70th Street. Other land belonging within Hickory Grove are spread out along Interstate 172. This includes the Columbus Road/Wisman Lane interchanges and the Rim Road subdivision on State Street.

Edge city status 
Originally Hickory Grove was left untouched by the urban sprawl of Quincy, but in the early 1990s Illinois Route 336 was upgraded to Interstate Highway standards as Interstate 172.

In 2004, construction began on the Prairie Crossing Shopping Complex (now known as Prairie Trail) which once completed more traffic would head towards their way.  Quincy annexed Hickory Grove later that year.

Prairie Trail 
Prairie Trail is a new shopping complex built as the first commercial zone of Quincy east of Interstate 172. 63rd street serves the lots eastern border, an exit ramp as the western border and Illinois Route 104 (Broadway) as its northern border. Much of the complex opened in 2005. Initial tenants included: Lowe's, Kohl's, Old Navy, T.J. Maxx, MC Sports, Great Clips salon, Shoe Carnival, Buffalo Wild Wings, and Best Buy.

Mill Creek Confusion 
Sometimes Hickory Grove is referred to as the Mill Creek township, because Mill Creek travels through the city. This is also because "Mill Creek" is the name on the two water towers in the town. However, a Mill Creek, Illinois exists elsewhere in the state.

References

Unincorporated communities in Adams County, Illinois
Quincy, Illinois micropolitan area
Quincy–Hannibal area
Unincorporated communities in Illinois